Sărata Veche is a commune in Făleşti District, Moldova. It is composed of three villages:, Hitrești, Sărata Nouă and Sărata Veche.

References

Communes of Fălești District